Dutchtown was a mining community high in the Never Summer Mountains of what is now Rocky Mountain National Park. The ghost town lies just below the timberline, and comprises the ruins of four cabins. The site was inhabited by squatters who were made unwelcome in Lulu City, in the Kawuneeche Valley a couple of miles to the east. Dutchtown existed to work the same silver deposits mined by Lulu City residents, but existed as a suburb of Lulu City to accommodate Dutch miners who were run out of town after a drunken affray in Lulu City. It existed from about 1879 to about 1884.

The town site was placed on the National Register of Historic Places on January 29, 1988.

See also
National Register of Historic Places listings in Grand County, Colorado

References

National Register of Historic Places in Rocky Mountain National Park
Ghost towns in Colorado
Houses in Grand County, Colorado
Former populated places in Grand County, Colorado
National Register of Historic Places in Grand County, Colorado
Populated places on the National Register of Historic Places in Colorado
1879 establishments in Colorado
Populated places established in 1879